The state of New Mexico is served by the following area codes:

 505, which serves northwest New Mexico including Santa Fe and Albuquerque
 575, which serves eastern and southern New Mexico

Area code list
 
New Mexico
Area codes